Procecidochares blanci is a species of tephritid or fruit flies in the genus Procecidochares of the family Tephritidae.

Distribution
United States.

References

Tephritinae
Insects described in 2001
Diptera of North America
Procecidochares